Runk may refer to:

Runk, the Hungarian name for several places in Romania:
Runcu Salvei, a commune in Bistrița-Năsăud County
Runc, a village in Sărmaș Commune, Harghita County
John Runk (1791–1872), American politician
Carl Runk, American football coach
Dorothy Runk Mennen (1915–2011), American voice teacher
Jennie Runk

See also
Runk Bridge, a historic Pratt truss bridge in Huntingdon County, Pennsylvania
4662 Runk, a minor planet
Raja Aur Runk, a 1968 Bollywood film